Bulbophyllum wolfei, commonly known as the fleshy snake orchid, is a species of epiphytic or lithophytic orchid with thin, creeping rhizomes, and flattened pseudobulbs each with a single thick, fleshy, dark green leaf and a single cream-coloured flower with dark red stripes. It mostly grows on rainforest trees in tropical North Queensland.

Description 
Flowering occurs from April to September.

Taxonomy and naming
Bulbophyllum wolfei was first formally described in 1991 by Bruce Gray and David Jones and the description was published in Austrobaileya. The specific epithet (wolfei) honours "Mr T.J. (Tom) Wolfe, of Atherton, Queensland" for his assistance with orchid research.

Distribution and habitat

References

wolfei
Endemic orchids of Australia
Orchids of Queensland
Plants described in 1991